Mick Linden is the bassist for the Celtic/Fusion group Bad Haggis.

Linden was featured in issue 40 of Bassics magazine.

References

Year of birth missing (living people)
Living people
American bass guitarists
Place of birth missing (living people)